Talak may refer to:

 Talak, Karnataka, a village in Yadgir district, Karnataka, India
 Talak, Nepal, a village in Nepal
 Talak, Niger, a region in Niger.

See also
 Talaq, an Arabic word meaning "to release" or "to divorce", used to represent the formulaic process of divorcing in Islam.
 Talaka, 20th century Belarusian youth organization